Lutz Götz (1891 – 1958) was a German stage and film actor.

Selected filmography
 The Immortal Vagabond (1930)
 Patriots (1937)
 Legion Condor (1939)
 Congo Express (1939)
 Counterfeiters (1940)
 Above All Else in the World (1941)
 Quax the Crash Pilot (1941)
 Sky Hounds (1942)
 Tonelli (1943)
 A Salzburg Comedy (1943)
 The Golden Spider (1943)
 Die Feuerzangenbowle (1944)
 Tell the Truth (1946)
 Quax in Africa (1947)
 The Last Year (1951)
 Prosecutor Corda (1953)
 The Wishing-Table (1956)

References

Bibliography
 Richards, Jeffrey. Visions of Yesterday. Routledge & Kegan Paul, 1973.

External links

1891 births
1958 deaths
German male film actors
German male stage actors
Male actors from Munich